Kristoffer Reitan (born 8 March 1998) is a Norwegian professional golfer on the European Tour. In 2018 he become the first Norwegian to play in the U.S. Open.

Career
Reitan had a successful amateur career and won the Valderrama Boys Invitational, Italian International U16 Championship, Skandia Junior Open and the Junior Orange Bowl Championship. As part of the national team he represented Norway at the European Young Masters, European Boys' Team Championship and the European Amateur Team Championship. 

In 2014 he won the Toyota Junior Golf World Cup together with Viktor Hovland. He teamed up with Hovland again for the 2018 Eisenhower Trophy, where they finished fifth. He also represented Europe at the 2018 Junior Ryder Cup and 2018 Bonallack Trophy, and won the 2016 Jacques Léglise Trophy. He finished runner-up at the opening event of the 2017 Nordic Golf League, behind Florian Fritsch.

Still a 20-year-old amateur, Reitan secured a spot at the 2018 U.S. Open through the Walton Heath Golf Club sectional qualifier, to become the first Norwegian to play in the U.S. Open. 

Reitan earned the 26th card at the 2018 European Tour Qualifying School, the only amateur to earn a European Tour card. In his debut season on the European Tour his best finish was tie for fifth at the ISPS Handa World Super 6 Perth in Australia. He ended the season 141st in the rankings, retaining conditional status.

Amateur wins
2013 Valderrama Boys Invitational, Italian International U16 Championship
2014 Skandia Junior Open
2015 Junior Orange Bowl Championship
Source:

Results in major championships

CUT = missed the half-way cut

Team appearances
Amateur
European Young Masters (representing Norway): 2013, 2014
European Boys' Team Championship (representing Norway): 2013, 2014, 2015, 2016
Toyota Junior Golf World Cup (representing Norway): 2014 (winners), 2015
Jacques Léglise Trophy (representing Continental Europe): 2014, 2015, 2016 (winners)
European Amateur Team Championship (representing Norway): 2017
Bonallack Trophy (representing Europe): 2018
Junior Ryder Cup (representing Europe): 2018
Eisenhower Trophy (representing Norway): 2018
Source:

See also
2018 European Tour Qualifying School graduates

References

External links

Norwegian male golfers
European Tour golfers
Sportspeople from Oslo
1998 births
Living people